First Love, also known as Crazy Little Thing Called Love, (Sing lek lek thi riak wa... rak, lit. "A Little Thing Called Love") is a 2010 Thai romantic comedy film and a 2011 Asian sleeper hit starring Mario Maurer and Pimchanok Luevisadpaibul. It tells the story of a seventh-grade 14-year-old girl Nam, who falls in love with her senior of tenth-grade Chon and tries desperately to win his attention.

Plot
Nam is a bespectacled, swarthy 14-year-old seventh-grader who is considered unattractive. She harbors a crush on Chon, a good-looking and popular tenth-grade freshman from her school who she feels is way out of her league. She hangs out with her three best friends known as the Cheer Gang and helps her mother out in their family-owned bed and breakfast. An average student, she begins to take her studies seriously in hopes of seeing her father in the United States who works there as a chef's assistant. She and her sister are promised a plane ticket if they ever rank first in school.

While lining up for refreshments, Nam and her friends are disturbed by two boys who rudely cut in front of them. Chon, who saw the girls being harassed, swept into the rescue and bought the beverages for Nam and her friends. On her way home, Nam learns that Chon got into a fight with the two boys and quickly rushes to the scene, only to find the situation has been dissipated. She finds a bloodied button on the floor (which she assumes is Chon's) and keeps it as a memento, calling it Mr. Button. The next day, Chon receives corporal punishment from the school superintendent for the incident. Feeling guilty, Nam approaches Chon to give him some plasters while Chon assures her that none of it was her fault. He thanks her and calls her by her name. Nam rejoices at the thought of her crush knowing her name.

At the urge of her three best friends, Nam follows the advice of the guidebook called Nine Recipes of Love, which can supposedly win the affection of the man of your dreams if followed closely. Some of the methods described in the book sound outlandish to Nam at first but she willingly tries them all eventually. These include spelling Chon's name on the stars, controlling his mind, and leaving chocolates on his motorbike - all in a seemingly futile attempt to get noticed by him. Over the course of the summer, she tries to improve her looks by wearing braces, switching from glasses to contacts, and doing all sorts of skin regiments.

At the beginning of eighth-grade, Nam and her friends get into a scuffle with her schoolmate, Faye, while signing up for after-school clubs. As a consequence, Nam and her friends are barred from signing up to the popular Thai Dance Club. Instead, their English teacher, Teacher Inn, connives them into signing up for the English Drama Club, becoming part of the school production of Snow White in the upcoming school fair. To Nam's surprise, she finds Chon working in the production as a stage painter. She is then picked by Teacher Inn to play the titular role since she is the best in English in her class. She also befriends Pin, a female upperclassman and one of Chon's close friends, who is recruited by Teacher Inn to be the makeup artist for the school play. Pin gives Nam a makeover and when she asks for his opinion, Chon only replies that he doesn't see any difference. During rehearsals, Chon saves Nam from falling off the stage. On the day of the play, Chon is noticeably absent and Nam assumes he went to see the Thai Dance Club. In actuality, he is coerced by the school superintendent to participate in a photography contest that happens to be on the same day as the school fair. Later at the backstage, she sees an apple with a bite in it left on her station with a note saying that they tasted the apple and it isn't poisoned. Nam quickly becomes a hot topic in their school when footage of her performance is shown at the school cafeteria. Meanwhile, Chon's childhood friend, Top, transfers to their school in the middle of the year. After seeing Nam in the school play, Top falls in love at first sight.

Now in the ninth-grade, Nam experiences a sudden rise in popularity when she is chosen, once again by Teacher Inn, as the drum major for the regional sports parade. At the same time, Chon, who is now a senior, finally manages to get into the school's soccer team after making the penalty shot. During Valentine's Day, Chon gives Nam an uprooted rose bush. But her glee suddenly turns into disappointment when he tells her that it is from his friend. Later that night, she finds a note in her bag telling her to meet on the third floor of the school building. The following day, she goes to the meeting place where she sees Chon coming up the stairs to greet her. However, they were interrupted by Top who tells Nam that the note was his and proceeds to ask her to be his girlfriend. Taken aback by this sudden proposal, Nam was unable to respond in fear of hurting Top and ruining her chances with Chon. Top, on the other hand, takes this as acceptance and declares her as his girlfriend. He easily drags her into watching Chon's games and joining their outings, which unintendedly only brought her closer to Chon. As Nam begins to spend more time with Chon and his friends, the Cheer Gang grows cold and distant towards her.

Chon candidly opens up to Nam about her father. He tells her that he was born on the day his father missed the penalty shot and feels that he is the reason why his father has given up on soccer. During a friend's birthday party, Top shares the story about a promise he made with Chon: that they would never like the same girl. In the middle of the celebration, Top suddenly kisses Nam on the cheek much to her discomfort. Later that night, Nam tells Top to not involve himself with her any more and that he didn't have the right to kiss her as she never agreed to be his girlfriend in the first place. She tells him that she is in love with someone else but doesn't tell him who. Out of distraught, Top makes Chon promise that he will not pursue Nam. Without any more friends, Nam begins to focus her time on studying for the finals.

As the end of the year approaches, Nam has a tearful reconciliation with her three best friends. In the following days, she learns that she ranked first in school, which means that it's only a matter of time before she is bound for America. The Cheer Gang gets together for one last time to help Nam finish the unwritten "tenth recipe" of the love guidebook: direct confession. With the help of her friends, Nam plucks up the courage to go to Chon and finally confesses her feelings for him. She tearfully reveals that she has been in love with him for the past three years and hands him a rose trimmed from the same rose bush that he gave her on Valentine's, along with Mr. Button. However, to her dismay, Chon reveals that he had begun dating Pin about a week ago, which leaves Nam visibly hurt and heartbroken. That night, Chon comes home to find out that he is accepted into the trainee program of the Bangkok Glass Football Club but has to leave for the camp the following morning. He goes into his room and takes out a notebook containing all of Nam's photos. It is revealed that Chon has been in love with Nam all these years and has kept a diary in hopes of revealing his true feelings to her one day. But as it turned out, he never mustered the courage to do and the timing couldn't have been worse. He leaves the diary in front of Nam's house before leaving for Bangkok. At the same time, Nam is shown crying in her bedroom.

Nine years later, Nam has made a name for herself as a successful fashion designer in New York. She returns to Thailand after being invited as a guest in a TV talk show. She talks about her career and recounts her days in her old school. As soon as the topic of her first love is brought up, she gets a surprise visit from Chon who is revealed to have given up his soccer career in order to pursue professional photography. Chon takes out Mr. Button and returns it to Nam, telling her that she's mistaken it as his. Nam then asks Chon if he has been married, to which he replies that he has been waiting for someone to return from the U.S. after all these years.

Cast

Releases
Opening on Thailand's Queen's Birthday/Mother's Day holiday weekend of August 12 – 15, 2010, First Love was in third place behind the slapstick monastic comedy Luangphee Teng 3 and Toy Story 3, but rose to second place the following weekend. At last count, First Love had earned around $2.6 million (or ฿70 million).

It was initially televised on ABS-CBN, dubbed in Filipino (Tagalog) on June 5, 2011, and was replayed on June 20 and October 28. The movie re-aired on its movie cable network during the thanksgiving season due to viewers' requests at 8 pm. It was shown again on March 30, 2012, and June 9, 2012, under free movie block Kapamilya Blockbusters. The full and uncut scenes are aired on its subsidiary network and Filipino-Asian Blockbuster Movie Network on Cable Cinema One.

The movie was released in Shanghai for the 2011 Shanghai International Film Festivals.

Soundtracks
 "Someday", sung by Marisa Sukosol Numphakdi
 "A Little Thing Called Love", sung by Wan Thanakrit
 "Because of My Heart", sung by Chick Whantana
 "Someday I'll Be Good Enough", sung by Bodyslam
 "The Star", sung by Pimchanok Luevisadpaibul
 "Day, Month, Year (DMY)", sung by Kachamat Pormsaka Na-Sakonnakorn

Reception
The film lauded for its countryside "feel-good" approach and its natural performances, which contrasts most romantic teen comedies at the time.  In Thailand, the film placed in 3rd place from its weekend gross in almost a hundred cinemas and then up to 2nd place on the next weekend behind Kuan Mun Ho. The other two movies (including Toy Story 3) simultaneously released with First Love dropped to 3rd and 4th respectively. The film managed to maintain its position in 3rd place the following weekends and stayed inside the top 5 for six consecutive weeks. The film was shown in cinemas for nearly ten weeks (until October 2010), making it one of the longest-running movies in the history of Thai cinema. The film grossed a total of $2,659,443, becoming the second highest-grossing locally produced film in Thailand.

By early 2011, copies of the film were uploaded on the Internet, with several other countries applying for screening rights.

In the Philippines, the movie made an impact on viewers after it was dubbed in Filipino and shown on free TV on June 5, 2011 on ABS-CBN. It dominated the daytime viewership ratings, Just 2 weeks after it was first shown on free TV, on June 20, the film repeated in an afternoon slot. The movie block time slot got the highest rating compared to other programs.

Mario Maurer and Pimchanok Luevisadpaibul, the main stars of the movie, arrived in the Philippines together on August 3, 2013 for their fan conference on the following day as part of their endorsement deal with a local clothing brand.

Due to the film's success in the Philippines, Star Cinema produced and released the Filipino romantic comedy film Suddenly It's Magic which starred Erich Gonzales, Mario Maurer, and Pimchanok Luevisadpaibul.

Accolades

Sequel
In 2012, it has been announced that First Love will have its sequel and will be produced by the same team however, the sequel never came to fruition. In 2020, J&T Express released a commercial featuring Mario Maurer and Pimchanok Luevisadpaibul reprising  the roles of P’Shone and Nam. In the commercial, Nam opens up a fashion boutique. During the opening day, P’Shone wasn’t able to attend due to tight schedule in his work, resulting a turbulence to their relationship. A day later, P’Shone sent his diary to Nam through a package. When Nam receives the diary, she rekindles her relationship with P’Shone.

Remake and Adaptation
In 2019, the movie was adapted into a Chinese web series titled A Little Thing Called First Love starring Lai Kuan-lin.  It broadcast on Hunan TV.

References

External links

2010 films
2010 romantic comedy films
Thai romantic comedy films
Films shot in Thailand